Timothy Ingold  (born 1 November 1948) is a British anthropologist, and Chair of Social Anthropology at the University of Aberdeen.

Background
Ingold was educated at Leighton Park School in Reading, and his father was the mycologist Cecil Terence Ingold. He attended Churchill College, Cambridge, initially studying natural sciences but shifting to anthropology (BA in Social Anthropology 1970, PhD 1976). His doctoral work was conducted with the Skolt Saami of northeastern Finland, studying their ecological adaptations, social organisation and ethnic politics. Ingold taught at the University of Helsinki (1973–74) and then the University of Manchester, becoming Professor in 1990 and Max Gluckman Professor in 1995.  In 1999, he moved to the University of Aberdeen. In 2015, he received the honorary doctorate by Leuphana University of Lüneburg (Germany). He has four children.

Contributions
His interests are wide-ranging and his scholarly approach is individualistic. They include environmental perception, language, technology and skilled practice, art and architecture, creativity, theories of evolution in anthropology, human-animal relations, and ecological approaches in anthropology.

Early concern was with northern circumpolar peoples, looking comparatively at hunting, pastoralism and ranching as alternative ways in which such peoples have based a livelihood on reindeer or caribou.

In his recent work, he links the themes of environmental perception and skilled practice, replacing traditional models of genetic and cultural transmission, founded upon the alliance of neo-Darwinian biology and cognitive science, with a relational approach focusing on the growth of embodied skills of perception and action within social and environmental contexts of human development. This has taken him to examining the use of lines in culture, and the relationship between anthropology, architecture, art and design. He discusses his entire career in From science to art and back again: The pendulum of an anthropologist (2016).

Writing within the anthropological realm of phenomenology, Ingold explores the human as an organism which 'feels' its way through the world that "is itself in motion"; constantly creating and being changed by spaces and places as they are encountered.

Honours and awards
Ingold was appointed Commander of the Order of the British Empire (CBE) in the 2022 Birthday Honours for services to anthropology.

 Rivers Memorial Medal, RAI (1989)
 Fellow of the British Academy (1997)
 Fellow of the Royal Society of Edinburgh (2000)
 Huxley Memorial Medal recipient —established in 1900 in memory of Thomas Henry Huxley— for services to anthropology by the Council of the Royal Anthropological Institute of Great Britain and Ireland, the highest honour of the RAI (2014)
 Honorary doctorate of the Leuphana University of Lüneburg (2015)

Bibliography
 Ingold, T. (2021). Correspondences. Polity, London, UK.
 Ingold, T. (2018). Anthropology: Why it matters. Polity, London, UK.
 Ingold, T. (2017). Anthropology and/as education. Routledge, London, UK.
 Ingold, T. (2015). The Life of Lines. Routledge, London, UK.
 Ingold, T. (2013). Making: Anthropology, Archaeology, Art and Architecture. Routledge, London, UK.
 Ingold, T. & Palsson, G. (eds.) (2013). Biosocial Becomings: Integrating Social and Biological Anthropology. Cambridge University Press, Cambridge, MS.
 Janowski, M. & Ingold, T. (eds.) (2012). Imagining Landscapes: Past, Present and Future.  Ashgate, Abingdon, UK.
 Ingold, T. (2011). Being Alive: Essays on Movement, Knowledge and Description. Routledge, London, UK.
 Ingold, T. (2011). Redrawing Anthropology: Materials, movements, lines.  Ashgate, Aldershot.
 Ingold, T. & Vergunst, J. (eds.) (2008). Ways of Walking: Ethnography and Practice on Foot.  Ashgate, Aldershot.
 Ingold, T. (2007). Lines: A Brief History. Routledge, Oxon, UK.
 Hallam, E. & Ingold, T. (2007). Creativity and Cultural Improvisation. A.S.A. Monographs, vol. 44, Berg Publishers, Oxford.
 Ingold, T. (2000). The perception of the environment: essays on livelihood, dwelling and skill. London: Routledge.
 Ingold, T. (1996). Key Debates In Anthropology
 Ingold, T. (1986). Evolution and social life. Cambridge: Cambridge University Press.
 Ingold, T. (1986). The appropriation of nature: essays on human ecology and social relations. Manchester: Manchester University Press.
 Ingold T. (1980). Hunters, pastoralists and ranchers: reindeer economies and their transformations . Cambridge: Cambridge University Press.
 Ingold T. (1976). The Skolt Lapps today. Cambridge: Cambridge University Press.

See also
 Taskscape

Further reading

 Tim Ingold. On the Distinction between Evolution and History. Social Evolution & History. Vol. 1, num.1, 2002, pp. 5–24
 Tim Ingold. Towards an Ecology of Materials. Audio recording of lecture given in University College Dublin, February 2012.
 Tim Ingold. Interview with Tim Ingold on October 05, 2011. In Ponto Urbe, Revista do Núcleo de Antropologia Urbana da USP, Num.11, Dec. 2012.

References

Social anthropologists
British anthropologists
Fellows of the British Academy
Fellows of the Royal Society of Edinburgh
Alumni of Churchill College, Cambridge
Academics of the University of Aberdeen
1948 births
Living people
Environmental social scientists
People associated with The Institute for Cultural Research
Commanders of the Order of the British Empire